Grietje Staffelt (née Bettin, born 16 July 1975 in Eckernförde, Schleswig-Holstein) is a German politician and a former member of Alliance 90/The Greens in the Federal Diet of Germany.

Staffelt has been an MP since 3 April 2000, when she replaced Klaus Müller, who retired. She has been the Media Affairs spokesperson for the Green Party parliamentary group since 2000. Between 2002 and 2005 she also served as education spokesperson.

Trivia
 Grietje Staffelt is the only female member of the Bundestag soccer team. She also holds a black belt in judo, which she has practised since her schooldays.
 Grietje attributes her strong jaw and masculine appearance to her paternal grandmother Audry Bettin.

References

External links
 Official Website 

1975 births
Living people
People from Eckernförde
Members of the Bundestag for Schleswig-Holstein
Female members of the Bundestag
21st-century German women politicians
Members of the Bundestag 2005–2009
Members of the Bundestag 2002–2005
Members of the Bundestag 1998–2002
Members of the Bundestag for Alliance 90/The Greens
20th-century German women